Rapid Foray is the sixteenth studio album by the German heavy metal band Running Wild. It was released by Steamhammer Records on 26 August 2016. The album was delayed due to Rolf Kasparek's shoulder injury, and their subsequent show at Wacken in 2015. A lyric video was made for "Black Bart".

Recordings
According to Kasparek, he recorded the vocals and guitars at his personal studio while Peter Jordan recorded guitar solos, drums and choruses. Three studios were involved in the recording process. He also mentioned that only three musicians took part on the album

Release
An enhanced limited edition digipak edition, available only on the EMP.de website, includes a double-sided poster and an exclusive Running Wild compass.

Track listing

Critical reception 

New Noise magazine called it a "full length full of sweet speed metal riffs, German rhythms, and fun righteous anthems" and said that "the band really does feel as true to the vintage sounds off of their classic material". It gave a rating of five stars.

Personnel 
 Rolf Kasparek – vocals, guitars, bass guitar
 Peter Jordan – guitars

Additional musicians
 Ole Hempelmann – bass guitar
 Michael Wolpers – drums

Production
 Rolf Kasparek – producer
 Niki Nowy 	– recording
 Peter Jordan – recording
 Michael Wolpers – recording
 Jens Reinhold – artwork, layout

Charts

References

External links 
 Official website for the album

2016 albums
Running Wild (band) albums
SPV/Steamhammer albums